Tennessee's 27th Senate district is one of 33 districts in the Tennessee Senate. It has been represented by Republican Ed Jackson since 2014, succeeding Democrat Lowe Finney.

Geography
District 27 spans the state's border along the Mississippi River, also stretching inland to cover the city of Jackson. The district covers all of Crockett, Dyer, Lake, Lauderdale, and Madison Counties; other communities within the district include Dyersburg, Ripley, Tiptonville, Newbern, and Alamo.

The district is located entirely within Tennessee's 8th congressional district, and overlaps with the 73rd, 77th, 80th, and 82nd districts of the Tennessee House of Representatives. It borders the states of Kentucky, Missouri, and Arkansas.

Recent election results
Tennessee Senators are elected to staggered four-year terms, with odd-numbered districts holding elections in midterm years and even-numbered districts holding elections in presidential years.

2018

2014

Federal and statewide results in District 27

References 

27
Crockett County, Tennessee
Dyer County, Tennessee
Lake County, Tennessee
Lauderdale County, Tennessee
Madison County, Tennessee